Moorish Revival or Neo-Moorish is one of the exotic revival architectural styles that were adopted by architects of Europe and the Americas in the wake of Romanticist Orientalism. It reached the height of its popularity after the mid-19th century, part of a widening vocabulary of articulated decorative ornament drawn from historical sources beyond familiar classical and Gothic modes. Neo-Moorish architecture drew on elements from classic Moorish architecture and, as a result, from the wider Islamic architecture.

In Europe 

The "Moorish" garden structures built at Sheringham Hall, Norfolk, ca. 1812, were an unusual touch at the time, a parallel to chinoiserie, as a dream vision of fanciful whimsy, not meant to be taken seriously; however,  as early as 1826, Edward Blore used Islamic arches, domes of various size and shapes and other details of Near Eastern Islamic architecture to great effect in his design for Alupka Palace in Crimea, a cultural setting that had already been penetrated by authentic Ottoman styles.

By the mid-19th century, the style was adopted by the Jews of Central Europe, who associated Moorish and Mudéjar architectural forms with the golden age of Jewry in medieval Muslim Spain. It has also been argued that Jewish communities adopted this architecture (which in Western eyes was seen as stereotypical of "Islamic" or "Oriental" culture more broadly) for more complex reasons; mainly, as an affirmation or reclamation of the Middle Eastern or Semitic roots of their history and thus as a way of setting themselves apart from the surrounding Western or Christian society. This came at time when Jews were gaining more freedoms in some European societies and the construction of ostentatious synagogues was possible for the first time, thus provoking a search for a new distinct style of architecture. Historian John M. Efron of the University of California at Berkeley regards the popularity of Moorish revival architecture among builders of synagogues as a counterpoint to Edward Said's Orientalism, which criticizes European orientalism as inherently imperialist and racist, since the builders chose the style as an expression of admiration for the culture of the Muslim world. As a consequence, Moorish Revival spread around the globe as a preferred style of synagogue architecture for a long period until the early 20th century.

In Spain, the country conceived as the place of origin of Moorish ornamentation, the interest in this sort of architecture fluctuated from province to province. The mainstream was called Neo-Mudéjar. In Catalonia, Antoni Gaudí's profound interest in Mudéjar heritage governed the design of his early works, such as Casa Vicens or Astorga Palace. In Andalusia, the Neo-Mudéjar style gained belated popularity in connection with the Ibero-American Exposition of 1929 and was epitomized by Plaza de España (Seville) and Gran Teatro Falla in Cádiz. In Madrid, the Neo-Mudéjar was a characteristic style of housing and public buildings at the turn of the century, while the 1920s return of interest to the style resulted in such buildings as Las Ventas bullring and Diario ABC office. A Spanish nobleman built the Palazzo Sammezzano, one of Europe's largest and most elaborate Moorish Revival structures, in Tuscany between 1853 and 1889.

Although Carlo Bugatti employed Moorish arcading among the exotic features of his furniture, shown at the 1902 exhibition at Turin, by that time the Moorish Revival was very much on the wane almost everywhere. A notable exceptions were Imperial Russia, where the shell-encrusted Morozov House in Moscow (a stylisation of the Pena National Palace in Sintra), the Neo-Mameluk Dulber palace in Koreiz, and the palace in Likani exemplified the continuing development of the style.

In the Balkans

Another exception was Bosnia, where, after its occupation by Austria-Hungary, the new authorities commissioned a range of Neo-Moorish structures. The aim was to promote Bosnian national identity while avoiding its association with either the Ottoman Empire or the growing pan-Slavic movement by creating an "Islamic architecture of European fantasy". This included application of ornamentations and other Moorish design strategies neither of which had much to do with prior architectural direction of indigenous Bosnian architecture. The central post office in Sarajevo, for example, follows distinct formal characteristics of design like clarity of form, symmetry, and proportion while the interior followed the same doctrine. The National and University Library of Bosnia and Herzegovina in Sarajevo is an example of Pseudo Moorish architectural language using decorations and pointed arches while still integrating other formal elements into the design.

Other notable example in the region is the building of the Regional historical museum in Kardzhali, Bulgaria build in the 1920s, combining also Central Asian styles.

In the United States 

In the United States, Washington Irving's fanciful travel sketch, Tales of the Alhambra (1832), first brought Moorish Andalusia into readers' imaginations; one of the first neo-Moorish structures was Iranistan, a mansion of P. T. Barnum in Bridgeport, Connecticut. Constructed in 1848 and destroyed by fire ten years later, this architectural extravaganza "sprouted bulbous domes and horseshoe arches". In the 1860s, the style spread across America, with Olana, the painter Frederic Edwin Church's house overlooking the Hudson River, Castle Garden in Jacksonville and Longwood in Natchez, Mississippi usually cited among the more prominent examples. After the American Civil War, Moorish or Turkish smoking rooms achieved some popularity. There were Moorish details in the interiors created for the Henry Osborne Havemeyer residence on Fifth Avenue by Louis Comfort Tiffany. In 1893, The Great Saltair was built on the southern shores of The Great Salt Lake, adjacent to Salt Lake City. Under dozens of Moorish domes and lambrequin, polylobed, and keyhole arches, Saltair housed popular clubs, restaurants, bowling alleys, a hippodrome, rollercoaster, observation deck for the surrounding desert, and what was marketed as the largest dance hall in the world. Like Iranistan before it, Saltair was destroyed by fire in 1925 and again in 1970; the first of which, less than 30 years after opening. The 1914 Pittock Mansion in Portland, Oregon incorporates Turkish design features, as well as French, English, and Italian ones; the smoking room in particular has notable Moorish revival elements. In 1937, the Corn Palace in Mitchell, South Dakota added unusual minarets and Moorish domes, unusual because the polychrome decorations are made out of corn cobs of various colors assembled like mosaic tiles to create patterns. The 1891 Tampa Bay Hotel, whose minarets and Moorish domes are now the pride of the University of Tampa, was a particularly extravagant example of the style. Other schools with Moorish Revival buildings include David H. Zysman Hall at Yeshiva University in New York City. George Washington Smith used the style in his design for the 1920s Isham Beach Estate in Santa Barbara, California.

In India 

 Spanish Mosque, built by Viqar-ul-Umra at Hyderabad.

Theaters

In the United States

Around the world

Synagogues

Europe
 Munich synagogue, by Friedrich von Gärtner, 1832 was the earliest Moorish revival synagogue (destroyed on Kristallnacht)
 Semper Synagogue, by Gottfried Semper, Dresden,  1839–40 (destroyed on Kristallnacht)
 Leopoldstädter Tempel, Vienna, Austria,  1853–58 (destroyed on Kristallnacht)
 Dohány Street Synagogue, Budapest, Hungary, 1854–1859
 Leipzig synagogue, 1855 (destroyed on Kristallnacht in 1938)
 Glockengasse synagogue, Cologne, Germany, 1855–61 (destroyed on Kristallnacht)
 New Synagogue by Eduard Knoblauch, Berlin, 1859–1866
 New Synagogue, Ostrów Wielkopolski, Poland, 1857–1860
 Tempel Synagogue, Cracow, Poland, 1860–62
 Cetate Synagogue, Timişoara, Romania, by Ignaz Schumann, 1864–65
 Choral Temple, Bucharest, 1864–1866
 Zagreb Synagogue, 1867
 The Great Synagogue of Stockholm, Sweden, by Fredrik Wilhelm Scholander, 1867–1870
 Synagogue of Besançon, France, 1867–1870
 Spanish Synagogue, Prague, 1868
 Rumbach Street synagogue, Budapest, Hungary, 1872
 Czernowitz Synagogue, Czernowitz, Ukraine, 1873
 Great Synagogue of Florence, Tempio Maggiore, Florence, Italy, 1874–82
 Princes Road Synagogue, Liverpool, England, 1874
 Manchester Jewish Museum, built as a Sephardic synagogue, Manchester, England, 1874
 Vercelli Synagogue, Vercelli, Italy, 1878
 Vrbové synagogue, Vrbové, Slovakia, 1883
 Turin synagogue, Italy, 1884
 Great Synagogue in Pilsen, Pilsen, Bohemia, Czech Republic, 1888
 The Grand Choral Synagogue, St. Petersburg, Russia, 1888
 Esztergom Synagogue, Hungary, 1888
 Fabric New Synagogue in Timişoara, Romania, by Lipot Baumhorn, 1889
 Rosenberg synagogue, Olesno, Poland, 1889 (destroyed on Kristallnacht in 1938)
 La Ferté-sous-Jouarre synagogue, France, 1891
 Hollandse Synagoge, Antwerp, Belgium, 1893
 Second Luxembourg Synagogue, Luxembourg City, Luxembourg, 1894
 Great Choral Synagogue (Kyiv), Ukraine, 1895
 Opava synagogue, Czech Republic, 1895
 Olomouc Synagogue, Olomouc, Czech Republic, 1897 (destroyed in 1938)
 Prešov synagogue, Prešov, Slovakia, 1898
 Košice synagogue, Košice, Slovakia, 1899, interior of Rundbogenstil building
 Malacky synagogue, Slovakia, 1886, rebuilt 1900
 Sarajevo Synagogue, 1902
 Karaite Kenesa, Kyiv, 1902
 Jubilee Synagogue, Prague, Czech Republic, 1906
 Groningen Synagogue, Groningen, Netherlands, 1906
 Choral Synagogue, Minsk, Belarus, 1906
 Bet Israel Synagogue, Belgrade, Serbia, 1908. 
 Sofia Synagogue, Sofia, Bulgaria, 1909
 Galitska Synagogue, Kyiv, Ukraine, 1909
 Uzhgorod Synagogue, Uzhgorod, Ukraine, 1910
 Arabian House (Hotel Jadran) Skopje, North Macedonia, 1936–38

United States

 Isaac M. Wise Temple, also known as the Plum Street Temple, Cincinnati, Ohio, 1865
 Congregation Rodeph Shalom, Philadelphia, 1866 (no longer standing)
 Temple Emanu-El on Fifth Avenue at 43rd Street, Congregation Emanu-El of the City of New York  built in 1868, designed by Leopold Eidlitz, assisted by Henry Fernbach, (no longer standing)
 B'nai Sholom Temple, Quincy, Illinois, 1870
 Central Synagogue, Upper East Side, Manhattan, New York, 1872
 Vine Street Temple, Nashville, Tennessee, 1874
 Charter Oak Temple (Congregation Beth Israel), Hartford, Connecticut, 1876
 Temple of Israel, Wilmington, North Carolina, 1876 
 B'nai Israel Synagogue (Baltimore), Maryland, 1876
 Temple Adath Israel, Owensboro, Kentucky, 1877
 Prince Street Synagogue (Oheb Shalom,) Newark, New Jersey, 1884
 Eldridge Street Synagogue, Lower East Side, Manhattan, New York, 1887
 Congregation Beth Israel of Portland, Oregon, 1888 (no longer standing)
 Park East Synagogue, Upper East Side, Manhattan, New York, 1889
 Gemiluth Chessed, Port Gibson, Mississippi, 1891
 Temple Emanu-El (Helena, Montana), 1891
 Temple Beth-El, Corsicana, Corsicana, Navarro County, Texas, 1898–1900
 Temple Sinai (Sumter, South Carolina), 1912
 Young Israel of Flatbush, Midwood, Brooklyn, 1923
 Ohabei Shalom, Brookline, Massachusetts, 1925
 Congregation Ohab Zedek, Upper West Side, Manhattan, New York, 1926
 Congregation Rodeph Shalom, Philadelphia, 1928

Latin America
Sephardic Temple, Barracas district, Buenos Aires, Argentina
Palacio Arabe, downtown Mar del Plata, Argentina, 1945

Churches and cathedrals

 The Cathedral of the Holy Trinity, Gibraltar (1825–1832) an early example of Moorish revival architecture is located in Gibraltar, which formed part of Moorish Al-Andalus between 711 and 1462 AD.
 Immaculate Conception Church (New Orleans), (a.k.a. Jesuit Church) is a striking example of Moorish Revival Architecture. Across the street was the College of the Immaculate Conception, housing a chapel with two stained glass domes. The chapel was disassembled and about half of it (one of the stained glass domes, eleven of the windows) was installed in the present Jesuit High School.

Shrines and temples

The Shriners, a fraternal organization,  often chose a Moorish Revival style for their Temples.  Architecturally notable Shriners Temples include:

 Acca Temple Shrine, Richmond, Virginia, currently Altria Theater, formerly 'The Landmark Theater' and 'The Mosque'
 Algeria Shrine Temple, Helena, Montana
 Almas Temple, Washington D.C.
 El Zaribah Shrine Auditorium, Phoenix, Arizona
 Jaffa Shrine Center, Altoona, Pennsylvania
 Medinah Temple,  Chicago, Illinois now a Bloomingdale's.
 Murat Shrine, Indianapolis, Indiana, the largest Shrine temple in North America, now officially known as Old National Centre.
 New York City Center, now used as a concert hall
 Shrine Auditorium, Los Angeles, California
 Tripoli Shrine Temple, Milwaukee, Wisconsin
 Zembo Mosque, a Masonic Temple in Harrisburg, Pennsylvania
 The Scottish Rite Temple in Santa Fe, New Mexico, while not a Shrine Temple, is a Masonic building that uses the Moorish Revival architectural style.

Other buildings

 Building of the Regional historical museum in Kardzhali, Bulgaria, 1922-1930
 Palace of Manguinhos, site of the Oswaldo Cruz Foundation, in Rio de Janeiro, Brazil, 1905-1918
 "Mosque" shaped steam-generation plant in Sanssouci Park, Potsdam, Prussia, 1842
 The Zacherlfabrik, Vienna, 1892
 City hall, Brcko, Bosnia and Herzegovina, 1892
 City hall, Sarajevo, Bosnia and Herzegovina, 1894
 Jewish Hospital, Lviv, Ukraine, 1900
 Mostar Gymnasium, Mostar, Bosnia and Herzegovina, 1902
 Former Yenidze Cigarette Factory, Dresden, Germany, 1908 (here, the "minarets" are used to disguise smokestacks)
 Gedung Sate, Bandung, Indonesia, 1924
 Casamaures, Saint-Martin-le-Vinoux, France, 1855
 Villa Zorayda, St. Augustine, FL, 1883
Campo Pequeno bullring, Lisbon, 1892
Henry B. Plant Museum, Tampa, FL, 1891
 Karlo Helmbold's House (Šeherezada), Zrenjanin, Serbia, by Ištvan Bart, 1900
 Atwater water treatment plant, Canal de l'Aqueduc, Montreal, QC, 1912–18
Scroll and Key Hall (Yale senior society building, New Haven, CT; 1869 and 1901)
Palacio de Valle in Cienfuegos, Cuba (1913–17)
The Citadel, a military college in Charleston, South Carolina

Gallery

See also

 Moorish Revival architecture in Bosnia and Herzegovina
 Islamic architecture
 Indo-Saracenic Revival architecture

Notes

Sources

External links 

  Moorish Revival in New York Architecture

 
Architectural styles
Revival architectural styles
 
Orientalism by type
House styles
19th-century architectural styles
20th-century architectural styles